In mathematics, a Ditkin set, introduced by , is a closed subset of the circle such that a function f vanishing on the set can be approximated by functions φnf with φ vanishing in a neighborhood of the set.

References

Mathematical analysis